Ziba Makan (also Romanized as Zībā Makān) is a village in Jam Rural District, in the Central District of Jam County, Bushehr Province, Iran. At the 2006 census, its population was 206, in 41 families.

References 

Populated places in Jam County